Hawizeh may refer to:
Hawizeh Marshes, marshes in Khuzestan Province
Hoveyzeh, a city in Khuzestan Province